Rafael Vásquez Rodríguez (born 21 November 1955) is a Peruvian politician and a former Congressman representing Lima for the 2006–2011 term. Vásquez belongs to the Peruvian Nationalist Party although he was elected under the Peruvian Nationalist Party-Union for Peru ticket.

External links

Official Congressional Site

Living people
Union for Peru politicians

Peruvian Nationalist Party politicians
Members of the Congress of the Republic of Peru
1955 births